The 1934 Wimbledon Championships took place on the outdoor grass courts at the All England Lawn Tennis and Croquet Club in Wimbledon, London, United Kingdom. The tournament was held from Monday 25 June until Saturday 7 July 1934. It was the 54th staging of the Wimbledon Championships, and the third Grand Slam tennis event of 1934. Fred Perry and Dorothy Round won the singles titles.

Finals

Men's singles

 Fred Perry defeated  Jack Crawford, 6–3, 6–0, 7–5

Women's singles

 Dorothy Round defeated  Helen Jacobs, 6–2, 5–7, 6–3

Men's doubles

 George Lott /  Lester Stoefen defeated  Jean Borotra /  Jacques Brugnon, 6–2, 6–3, 6–4

Women's doubles

 Simonne Mathieu /  Elizabeth Ryan defeated  Dorothy Andrus /  Sylvie Henrotin, 6–3, 6–3

Mixed doubles

 Ryuki Miki /  Dorothy Round defeated  Bunny Austin /  Dorothy Shepherd Barron, 3–6, 6–4, 6–0

References

External links
 Official Wimbledon Championships website

 
Wimbledon Championships
Wimbledon Championships
Wimbledon Championships
Wimbledon Championships